The SP postcode area, also known as the Salisbury postcode area, is a group of eleven postcode districts in southern England, within six post towns. These cover south Wiltshire (including Salisbury and Tidworth) and parts of north Dorset (including Gillingham and Shaftesbury) and west Hampshire (including Andover and Fordingbridge).

The letters in the postcode refer to the Salisbury Plain, a plateau within the postcode area.



Coverage
The approximate coverage of the postcode districts:

|-
! SP1
| SALISBURY
| Central Salisbury and northern suburbs: Laverstock, Stratford-sub-Castle
| Wiltshire
|-
! SP2
| SALISBURY
| Salisbury west suburbs, Quidhampton, Netherhampton, Wilton, Great Wishford
| Wiltshire
|-
! SP3
| SALISBURY
| Tisbury, Shrewton, Hindon, Chilmark, East Knoyle, Dinton
| Wiltshire
|-
! SP4
| SALISBURY
| Amesbury, Durrington, Laverstock and Ford
| Wiltshire
|-
! SP5
| SALISBURY
| Rural parishes southwest, south and east of Salisbury: Alderbury, Alvediston, Ashmore, Bishopstone, Bowerchalke, Britford, Broad Chalke, Clarendon, Coombe Bissett, Downton, Ebbesbourne Wake, Grimstead, Landford, Odstock, Pitton, Redlynch, Sixpenny Handley, Stratford Tony, Tollard Royal, West Dean, West Tytherley, Whiteparish, Winterslow
| Dorset, Wiltshire, New Forest
|-
! SP6
| FORDINGBRIDGE
| Fordingbridge, Alderholt, Rockbourne, Martin
| New Forest, Dorset
|-
! SP7
| SHAFTESBURY
| Shaftesbury, Compton Abbas, Fontmell Magna, Donhead St Andrew, Donhead St Mary, Berwick St John, Motcombe
| Dorset, Wiltshire
|-
! SP8
| GILLINGHAM
| Gillingham, Stour Provost, East Stour, West Stour, Kington Magna, Buckhorn Weston, Milton on Stour, Bourton
| Dorset
|-
! SP9
| TIDWORTH
| Tidworth, Shipton Bellinger
| Wiltshire, Test Valley
|-
! SP10
| ANDOVER
| Andover town
| Test Valley
|-
! SP11
| ANDOVER
| Outskirts of Andover and surrounding villages; also Longparish, Grateley, Thruxton, Ludgershall
| Test Valley, Basingstoke and Deane, Wiltshire
|}

Map

See also
Postcode Address File
List of postcode areas in the United Kingdom

References

External links
Royal Mail's Postcode Address File
A quick introduction to Royal Mail's Postcode Address File (PAF)

Postcode areas covering South West England